Nimasia is a monotypic moth genus of the family Erebidae. Its only species, Nimasia brachyura, is found in Saudi Arabia, Yemen and Oman. Both the genus and species were first described by Wiltshire in 1982.

References

Calpinae
Monotypic moth genera